Lubuk Alung Station (LA) is a class II train station located in Lubuk Alung, Padang Pariaman, Indonesia.

The station has five train lines with line 2 being a straight line in the direction of Duku - Padang and Kayu Tanam - Padang Panjang - Sawahlunto and line 3 being a straight line to and from Pariaman - Naras. Line 5 has been decommissioned.

Services 
 Sibinuang, to Padang and Naras (local economy)
 Lembah Anai, to Kayu Tanam and Duku, connected to Minangkabau Airport (economy commuter)

Gallery

References 

Railway stations in West Sumatra
Padang Pariaman Regency